This page provides links to other pages comprising the list of airports in Oceania.

Due to the number of airports, each country or territory has a separate list:

See also
 Wikipedia:WikiProject Aviation/Airline destination lists: Oceania

Lists of airports